Sälevä is medium-sized lake in the Vuoksi main catchment area. It is located in Sonkajärvi municipality, in the region of Northern Savonia in Finland. Sälevä is one of the biggest lakes in Sonkajärvi municipality.

See also
List of lakes in Finland

References

Lakes of Sonkajärvi